Carabus lusitanicus breuningi is a subspecies of beetle in the family Carabidae that is endemic to Spain. They are black coloured.

References 

lusitanicus breuningi
Beetles described in 1927
Endemic fauna of Spain
Taxa named by Ernő Csíki